The Lifted Veil may refer to:

 "The Lifted Veil" (novella), an 1859 novella by George Eliot
 The Lifted Veil (film), a 1917 American silent film directed by George D. Baker